Wilbur Chocolate is one of four brands manufactured by Cargill Cocoa & Chocolate North America. Most of the Wilbur brand products were produced in plants chocolate manufacturing company located in Lititz, Pennsylvania. Wilbur Chocolate was founded in Philadelphia in 1865 by Henry Oscar Wilbur and Samuel Croft. Cargill Cocoa & Chocolate NA produces hundreds of millions of pounds of chocolate and confectionery products a year. These ingredients are sold to food and candy manufactures across the Americas.

The company was bought by Cargill in 1992 and is part of that company's cocoa and chocolate labels, which also includes Peter's Chocolate (bought from Nestlé in 2002), Gerkens Cacao, and Veliche Belgian chocolate

Cargill closed the Wilbur Chocolate Factory in early 2016. By the summer of 2018 the former factory was being converted into condos.

Cocoa Sourcing 
Cargill Cocoa & Chocolate is focused on sustainable cocoa farming through the Cargill Cocoa Promise and UTZ Certification

Wilbur Chocolate Candy Store & Museum
The company's Wilbur Chocolate Factory in Lititz sells an assortment of Wilbur chocolates and other candy, and features the free Candy Americana Museum that tells the history of the company and how their chocolate is made. The exhibits include antique chocolate molds, tins and boxes, as well as hand-painted European and Oriental antique porcelain chocolate pots.  The museum was created by Penny Buzzard, wife of former Wilbur president John Buzzard, and opened in 1972.

On March 31, 2008, then Senator Barack Obama visited Wilbur Chocolate Company, drawing it into the national spotlight. Mr. Obama greeted a sizable crowd outside before venturing inside to taste-test various treats offered to the calorie-conscious candidate. The hometown newspaper, the Lititz Record Express, documented his visit with a photo gallery.

Wilbur Factory Closure & Redevelopment 
In January, 2016, Cargill stopped chocolate production at this historic landmark and laid off approximately 130 Wilbur employees. This officially ended Wilbur's celebrated 125-year-old tradition of chocolate-making in at this site. According to an announcement on October 29, 2015, Cargill would "close its plant in Lititz, Penn., on Broad Street and shift production of these offerings to Cargill’s other, more modern and efficient plants in Mount Joy, Lititz (West Lincoln Avenue) and Hazleton, Penn.; Milwaukee; and Ontario, Canada."

The closed factory was redeveloped into 25 condos and hotel. The Market at Wilbur, a food hall and restaurant, opened August 2019, while the Wilbur Lititz, a Tapestry Collection hotel by Hilton, opened September 2019.

Wilbur Buds
Its most popular candy, the Wilbur Bud, was introduced in 1893. The Hershey's Kiss which debuted in 1907, closely resembles a Wilbur Bud. The two products are also frequently compared due to the proximity of their manufacturers, Lititz being only about 20 miles (32 km) from the headquarters of The Hershey Company in Hershey, Pennsylvania. Wilbur Buds are not individually wrapped and have the word WILBUR on the bottom of the chocolate.

See also
 List of bean-to-bar chocolate manufacturers
 List of food and beverage museums

References

External links
Official website
Wilbur History

Lititz, Pennsylvania
Cargill
Culture of Lancaster, Pennsylvania
Chocolate companies based in Pennsylvania
Chocolate museums in the United States
Companies based in Lancaster County, Pennsylvania
Food and drink companies established in 1865
Buildings and structures in Lancaster County, Pennsylvania
Tourist attractions in Lancaster County, Pennsylvania
Food museums in the United States
Museums in Lancaster County, Pennsylvania
1865 establishments in Pennsylvania
Shops in the United States